Richard Green is an American retired ice hockey defenseman and coach who was an All-American for Boston University even after suffering a career-ending injury.

Career
Green was a standout star for Watertown High School in baseball, football, and hockey. He was recruited to Boston University in 1961 and made his debut with the varsity team the following year. While the Terriers weren't very good in his first season, Green was recognized as one of the bright spots. He received the ECAC Rookie of the Year and was named Second Team All-ECAC. He was held in such high regard that he was named team co-captain as a junior. BU was the middle of a renaissance in 1964 when tragedy struck; while at the on-campus Sargent Gym, Green suffered a freak neck injury and was forced to immediately end his playing career. Despite missing the later portion of the season, Green was named as the ECAC Most Outstanding Defenseman, to the All-ECAC First Team and an All-American.

After the injury curtailed his playing days, Green remained immersed in the game, and turned to coaching. After graduating in 1966 he became an assistant for the Terriers and helped the team reach the 1967 championship game. In 1968 he got his first head coaching stint with Colby College overseeing the tennis, football and ice hockey programs. After coaching one year of senior league hockey with the New England Blades, Green became a professional scout. He first worked with the Hartford Whalers and then signed on with the New York Islanders in 1980, just in time for the team's 4 consecutive Stanley Cup victories. He was inducted into the Boston University Athletic Hall of Fame in 1981.

Career statistics

Regular season and playoffs

Awards and honors

References

External links

Year of birth missing (living people)
Living people
American men's ice hockey defensemen
Ice hockey coaches from Massachusetts
People from Watertown, Massachusetts
Sportspeople from Middlesex County, Massachusetts
Boston University Terriers men's ice hockey players
Hartford Whalers scouts
New York Islanders scouts
AHCA Division I men's ice hockey All-Americans
Ice hockey players from Massachusetts